"Whipping Tom" was the nickname given to two sexual attackers in London and the nearby village of Hackney. Both would attack women walking alone and beat their buttocks.

While there is some evidence that an earlier attacker in around 1672 was also nicknamed "Whipping Tom" and carried out similar attacks on women, the earliest recorded attacker of this nature was active in central London in 1681. He would approach unaccompanied women in alleys and courtyards and bend them over his knee, lift their dress and spank them on the buttocks before fleeing. The inability of the authorities to apprehend the offender caused complaints about the ineffectiveness of London's constabulary, and prompted vigilante patrols in the affected areas. A local haberdasher and his accomplice were captured and tried for the attacks.

A second attacker nicknamed "Whipping Tom" was active in late 1712 in Hackney, then a rural village outside London. This attacker would approach lone women in the countryside, and beat them on their buttocks with a birch rod. Around 70 attacks were carried out before a local man named Thomas Wallis was captured and confessed to the attacks.

Earlier Whipping Toms
Although no record exists of any similar attacks prior to 1681 or of the nickname "Whipping Tom" existing prior to this date, a publication of 1681 mentions "the Generation of that Whipping Tom, that about Nine years since proved such an Enemy to the Milk-wenches Bums", implying that a similar attacker with the same nickname had operated in or around 1672.

Whipping Tom of 1681

The Whipping Tom of 1681 was active in the warren of small courtyards between Fleet Street, Strand and Holborn. He would wait in the narrow and dimly lit alleys and courtyards. After approaching an unaccompanied woman, he would grab her strongly, lift her dress, and slap her buttocks repeatedly with his hand before fleeing. He would sometimes accompany his attacks by shouting "Spanko!"

He attacked a large number of women, and while he would often use his bare hand, he would occasionally use a rod. Some of his victims were left badly injured by the attacks. He would appear, carry out his attacks and vanish with such speed that some people attributed him with supernatural powers.

There was a great public outcry in response to the attacks, which prompted complaints about the ineffectiveness of London's policing arrangements at the time. Women would carry "penknives, sharp bodkins, scissors and the like", and male vigilantes would dress in women's clothing and patrol the areas he was known to operate.

A haberdasher from Holborn and an accomplice were captured in late 1681 and tried for the attacks, although no record now exists of the trial or of their identities. In 1681, Whipping Tom Brought to Light and Exposed to View, an anonymously written book about the attacks, was released.

Whipping Tom of 1712
Between 10 October and 1 December 1712 a string of further attacks took place in fields near Hackney. This attacker, also nicknamed "Whipping Tom", would approach lone women and beat them with "a Great Rodd of Birch". Around 70 women were assaulted before a local man named Thomas Wallis was captured and confessed to the attacks. According to Wallis, he was "resolved to be Revenged on all the women he could come at after that manner, for the sake of one Perjur'd Female, who had been Barbarously False to him". He claimed that his plan was to attack a hundred women before Christmas, cease the attacks during the Twelve Days of Christmas, then resume the attacks in the new year.

See also
London Monster
Spring-heeled Jack

Notes and references
Notes

References

Bibliography

London crime history
Sex crimes in England